The Brunei national badminton team (Jawi: ڤاسوكن بدمينتون كبڠسأن بروني دارالسلام) represents Brunei in international badminton competitions. It is controlled by the Brunei National Badminton Association. The Bruneian team competed in the Summer Universiade in 2007. The team was placed in Group D and finished in 20th place.

The Bruneian men's team only competed in badminton at the Southeast Asian Games two times, in 1999 where it was the host team and in 2001. Brunei has yet to win a medal in badminton. Brunei made their badminton debut at the Summer Olympics in 2016, when Jaspar Yu Woon Chai was called up to represent Brunei at the 2016 Rio Olympics men's singles event from a tripartite invitation.

Former Indonesian badminton player, Imay Hendra was called up to the national team as a doubles coach.

History

Men's team 
Brunei first competed in the qualifying rounds for the 1986 Thomas & Uber Cup in Bangkok. The team lost to Malaysia and Australia 0-5 in their group. In 1999, the Bruneian men's team debuted in the 1999 Southeast Asian Games as host nation. The home team lost 1-3 against Singapore but managed to scored their first win in a team event when Amran Kambar performed an upsetting defeat against Kendrick Lee 13–15, 15–10, 15–9. Brunei competed for a second time in the 2001 Southeast Asian Games but lost to Malaysia 0-3 in the quarter-finals.

Women's team 
The Bruneian women's team withdrew from the qualifying rounds for the 1986 Thomas & Uber Cup.

Mixed team 
Brunei competed in the 2007 Summer Universiade mixed team event. The team were placed into Group D but withdrew from the competition. The team placed 20th in the overall rankings.

Competitive record

Summer Universiade 
Mixed team

SEA Games 

Men's team

Junior competitive record

ASEAN School Games

Boys' team

Girls' team

Staff 
The following list shows the coaching staff for the Brunei national badminton team.

Players

Current squad

Men's team

Women's team

References 

Badminton
National badminton teams
Badminton in Brunei